This is the discography for Belgian punk/new wave musician Plastic Bertrand.

Albums

Studio albums

Compilation albums

Singles

Notes

References 

Discographies of Belgian artists
Rock music discographies
New wave discographies